24 Persei is a star in the northern constellation of Perseus, located around 337 light years from the Sun. It is visible to the naked eye as a faint, orange-hued star with an apparent visual magnitude of 4.94. The object is moving closer to the Earth with a heliocentric radial velocity of −37 km/s.

This is an aging giant star with a stellar classification of K2 III, which indicates it has exhausted the hydrogen at its core and evolved away from the main sequence. It has 1.59 times the mass of the Sun and has expanded to about 24 times the Sun's radius. The star is radiating 185 times the Sun's luminosity from its enlarged photosphere at an effective temperature of 4,391 K.

References

K-type giants
Perseus (constellation)
BD+34 550
Persei, 24
018449
013905
0882